The 1985 Hawaii Rainbow Warriors football team represented the University of Hawaiʻi at Mānoa in the Western Athletic Conference during the 1985 NCAA Division I-A football season. In their ninth season under head coach Dick Tomey, the Rainbow Warriors compiled a 4–6–2 record.

Schedule

Personnel

References

Hawaii
Hawaii Rainbow Warriors football seasons
Hawaii Rainbow Warriors football